This article lists the diplomatic missions of South Ossetia. South Ossetia is state with limited recognition in Northern Caucasus. It did not receive recognition from any UN member states until after the 2008 South Ossetia war. It is recognized by Nauru, Nicaragua, Russia and Venezuela. In addition, it is recognized also by Abkhazia, Nagorno-Karabakh and Transnistria, which are not members of the United Nations. At present, South Ossetia has two embassies and five representative offices abroad. The Donetsk People's Republic and Luhansk People's Republic had diplomatic relations with South Ossetia, with each having representative offices, prior to being annexed by Russia in 2022.

Americas

 Managua (Embassy)

 Caracas (Embassy)

Asia
  
 Damascus (Embassy)
 
 İstanbul (Representative Office)

Europe

 
 Sukhumi (Embassy)
  Republika Srpska – 
 Banja Luka (Representative office)
 
 Rome (Representative office)
 
 Moscow (Embassy)

 Tiraspol (Representative office)

Subnational 

  (annexed by Russia in 2022, internationally unrecognized)
 Luhansk (Representative Office)

Oceania

 Aiwo (Representative Office)

See also
Foreign relations of South Ossetia
List of diplomatic missions in South Ossetia

Notes

References

External links
Ministry of Foreign Affairs of the Republic of South Ossetia

Foreign relations of South Ossetia
South Ossetia
Diplomatic missions